The 1928 Epsom by-election was a parliamentary by-election for the British House of Commons constituency of Epsom, Surrey on 4 July 1928.

Vacancy
The by-election was caused by the resignation of the sitting Unionist MP, Sir Rowland Blades. He had been MP here since winning the seat in 1918.

Election history
Epsom had been created in 1885 and won by a Unionist at every election since. The Unionists even won comfortably in 1923, when there was no Liberal candidate standing. The result at the last General Election was

Candidates
The Epsom Unionist Association chose 41-year-old Comdr. Archibald Southby as their candidate to defend the seat. He served in the Royal Navy and, in the period following the First World War, took part in the demilitarisation of Heligoland.  
The Epsom Constituency Labour Party selected Helen Keynes as their candidate to challenge for the seat. She was a member of the Fabian Society.
The Epsom Liberal Association, who had not put forward a candidate since the General election of January 1910, intervened with Samuel Parnell Kerr as their candidate. He had twice contested the neighbouring seat of Guildford, coming second in 1923 and third in 1924. He had been Private Secretary to the leading Liberal, Sir Herbert Samuel and the Insurance Commission. He was a Barrister.

Campaign
Polling Day was set for 4 July 1928.

Result
The Unionists held the seat, but the feature of the result was the Liberals pushing Labour into third place.

Aftermath
Southby held the seat at the following General Election, against a further challenge from Parnell Kerr, who managed a swing of 1.9% to the Liberals. Keynes did not fight the seat, contesting Horsham and Worthing instead and finishing third.
The result at the following General Election;

References

See also
 List of United Kingdom by-elections
 United Kingdom by-election records
 

1928 elections in the United Kingdom
By-elections to the Parliament of the United Kingdom in Surrey constituencies
1928 in England
Epsom
20th century in Surrey